Flora Burn was a pirate during the Golden Age of Piracy. She began her pirate career in 1741 and operated mainly on the East Coast of North America.

References

External links
 'The Burn Rose' is a historic fiction novel detailing Captain Burn's career as pirate captain and her retirement, for release in March 2013

Year of birth missing
Year of death missing
British female pirates
British pirates
18th-century pirates
British female criminals
Female